Chronicles of Chaos is a compilation album of the American thrash metal band Sadus. It contains songs from their first three albums, which at the time of release were sold out. It was released in 1997 by Mascot Records.

Track listing
"Certain Death" –  4:14
"Undead" –  4:03
"Sadus Attack" –  1:44
"Torture" –  2:24
"Hands of Fate" –  3:55
"Illusions" –  3:48
"Man Infestation" –  4:06
"Good Rid'nz" –  4:33
"Powers of Hate" –  3:40
"Arise" –  6:18
"Oracle of Obmission" –  3:50
"Through the Eyes of Greed" –  4:16
"Valley of Dry Bones" –  2:22
"Slave to Misery" –  4:01
"Facelift" –  7:00
"Deceptive Perceptions" –  3:35
"Echoes of Forever" –  6:00

 Tracks 1-6 are from Illusions, track 7-11 are from Swallowed in Black, tracks 12-17 are from A Vision of Misery.

Credits
Steve Di Giorgio – bass, keyboards
Jon Allen – drums
Darren Travis – guitar, vocals
Rob Moore – guitar

References

Sadus albums
1997 compilation albums
Thrash metal compilation albums
Mascot Records albums